The Admiralty Act 1690 (2 Will & Mary Sess 2 c 2) was an Act of the Parliament of England.

The whole Act was repealed by article 2(2) of, and Part II of Schedule 1 to, the Defence (Transfer of Functions) (No. 1) Order 1964 (SI 1964/488).

Notes

References 

Halsbury's Statutes

Acts of the Parliament of England
1690 in law